Metaselena is a genus of moths belonging to the subfamily Olethreutinae of the family Tortricidae.

Species
Metaselena alboatra Diakonoff, 1939
Metaselena allophlebodes Horak & Sauter, 1981
Metaselena diakonoffi Horak & Sauter, 1981
Metaselena lepta Horak & Sauter, 1981
Metaselena pemphigodes Horak & Sauter, 1981
Metaselena pithana Horak & Sauter, 1981
Metaselena platyptera Horak & Sauter, 1981
Metaselena rhabdota Horak & Sauter, 1981
Metaselena symphylos Horak & Sauter, 1981

See also
List of Tortricidae genera

References

External links
tortricidae.com

Tortricidae genera
Olethreutinae
Taxa named by Alexey Diakonoff